The Old Christian Cemetery (also known as Gora Qabristan, White-people's cemetery) is a cemetery situated in Peshawar, Khyber Pakhtunkhwa, Pakistan. It dates from Victoria era times.

References

External links
 

Cemeteries in Pakistan
Christianity in Pakistan
Peshawar
Christian cemeteries